Events from the year 1793 in Great Britain.

Incumbents
 Monarch – George III
 Prime Minister – William Pitt the Younger (Tory)
 Foreign Secretary – Lord Grenville
 Parliament – 17th

Events
 1 February – French Revolutionary Wars: The French First Republic declares war on Britain, the Dutch Republic and (soon afterwards) Spain.
 13 April
 The Bank of England issues the first £5 note.
 Manchester Penny Post launched, the first such service in the English provinces.
 May – Bennelong and Yemmerrawanne become the first Aboriginal Australians to visit Britain, landing at Falmouth, Cornwall, with Arthur Phillip.
 31 May – The ambassador of the Kingdom of Naples to Great Britain, Giambattista Tocco, Duke de Sicignano, commits suicide in London.
 June – the Macartney Embassy, a diplomatic mission to China led by George Macartney, 1st Earl Macartney, reaches Canton, but will be rebuffed by the Qianlong Emperor.
 20 July – Scottish explorer Alexander Mackenzie's 1792–1793 Peace River expedition to the Pacific Ocean reaches its goal at Bella Coola, British Columbia, making him the first known person to complete a transcontinental crossing of northern North America.
 23 August – the Board of Agriculture founded.
 12 September – Horatio Nelson, 1st Viscount Nelson meets Emma, Lady Hamilton in Naples.
 18 September – 18 December – French Revolutionary Wars: Siege of Toulon – Admiral Hood's squadron of Royal Navy ships supporting French Royalists is forced to withdraw from Toulon after a successful siege by Napoleon, taking a number of French ships – including the Lutine – with them.
 20 September – British troops from Jamaica land on the island of Saint-Domingue to join the Haitian Revolution in opposition to the French Republic and its newly freed slaves; on 22 September the main French naval base on the island surrenders peacefully to the Royal Navy.
 30 September – Bristol Bridge Riot against tolls: 11 people killed and 45 injured.
 5 October – French Revolutionary Wars: Raid on Genoa – the Royal Navy boards and captures French warships sheltering in the neutral port of Genoa.
 16 November – Catholic seminarians forced to leave the English College, Douai, settle at St Edmund's College, Ware, Hertfordshire.

Undated
 Westminster Quarters first written, for the bells of a new clock at the Church of St Mary the Great, Cambridge, by Prof. Joseph Jowett, probably with Prof. John Randall or William Crotch.
 Lansdown Crescent, Bath, designed by John Palmer, is completed.
 Physician Matthew Baillie publishes The Morbid Anatomy of Some of the Most Important Parts of the Human Body, a key text on pathology.
 Fritchley Tunnel, the world's oldest surviving railway tunnel is constructed at Fritchley in Derbyshire.
 Thomas Minton establishes his ceramics manufactory, Thomas Minton and Sons, in Stoke-upon-Trent, Staffordshire.
 Plymouth Gin Distillery begins production.

Births
 22 February – Mary Elizabeth Mohl, née Clarke, saloniste (died 1883 in France)
 3 March – William Macready, actor (died 1873)
 6 March – William Dick, founder of Edinburgh Veterinary College (died 1866)
 April – Thomas Addison, physician (died 1860)
 1 June
 Augustus Earle, painter (died 1838)
 Henry Francis Lyte, hymn-writer (died 1847)
 13 July
 John Clare, "peasant poet" (died 1864)
 George Green, mathematician (died 1841)
 10 August – John Crichton-Stuart, 2nd Marquess of Bute, industrialist (died 1848)
 25 September – Felicia Hemans, poet (died 1835)
 17 November – Charles Lock Eastlake, painter (died 1865)
 3 December – Clarkson Frederick Stanfield, marine painter (died 1867)
 7 December – Joseph Severn, portrait and subject painter (died 1879)
 Sarah Booth, actress (died 1867)

Deaths
 5 January – John Howie, biographer (born 1735)
 1 February – William Wildman Shute Barrington, statesman (born 1717)
 2 February – William Aiton, botanist (born 1731)
 6 February – Thomas Turner, diarist (born 1729)
 20 March – William Murray, 1st Earl of Mansfield, judge and politician (born 1705)
 26 March – John Mudge, physician and inventor (born 1721)
 29 April – John Michell, scientist (born 1724)
 11 June – William Robertson, historian (born 1721)
 26 June – Gilbert White, ornithologist (born 1720)
 7 October – Wills Hill, 1st Marquess of Downshire, politician (born 1718)
 16 October – John Hunter, surgeon (born 1728)
 18 October – Highflyer, racehorse (born 1774)

References

 
Years in Great Britain